Ali Safina (born 18 December 1983) is a Pakistani actor. He has starred in sitcoms such as Takkay Ki Ayegi Baraat and in 2015 made his film debut with Jalaibee.

Personal life 
Ali Safina was born in Multan, Pakistan then he moved to Oman with his parents where he completed his schooling in Pakistan School Muscat; for higher education he started off in The Caledonian College of Engineering in Oman and went on to Scotland where he got a degree in mechanical engineering. He is married to Pakistani model Hira Tareen in 2013, with whom he has one child.

Career 
Safina started his career as a DJ, VJ and roles in drama serials like Daag e nadamat, Takkay Ki Ayegi Baraat where he achieved real fame. He followed it up with funny talk shows as a host (Hunn Dass). Safina made his film debut in 2014 in a caper-crime film Jalaibee in which he played main role as Bugga opposite to Danish Taimoor and Wiqar Ali Khan.

Filmography

Film

Television

Telefilm

Accolades

References

External links 

 
 

Pakistani male television actors
Living people
People from Multan
1983 births
21st-century Pakistani male actors